Hydrellia philippina is a fly species in the family Ephydridae. It is a pest of millets.

Distribution
China, India, Philippines, Taiwan, Thailand, Vietnam.

References

Ephydridae
Insect pests of millets
Insects described in 1968
Diptera of Asia